Kirrawee railway station is located on the Cronulla line, serving the Sydney suburb of Kirrawee. It is served by Sydney Trains T4 line services.

History
Kirrawee station opened on 16 December 1939  when the Cronulla line opened from Sutherland to Cronulla. In 1954 there was a holdup, and a young man stole £43. Kirrawee railway station was rebuilt as part of the duplication of the remaining single track sections of the Cronulla line, under the Rail Clearways Program. Work commenced in late 2007 and was completed in April 2010. The platform used to extend to the other side of the Oak Road overbridge but was straightened by extending the platform to the east.

Platforms & services

Transport links
Transdev NSW operates two routes via President Avenue, near Kirrawee station:
976: Sutherland station to Grays Point
993: Westfield Miranda to Engadine

References

External links

Photo gallery showing construction of the Cronulla Line duplication
Kirrawee station details Transport for New South Wales

Easy Access railway stations in Sydney
Railway stations in Sydney
Railway stations in Australia opened in 1939
Cronulla railway line
Sutherland Shire